Pharidae is a taxonomic family of saltwater clams, marine bivalve molluscs in the order Adapedonta. This family of clams is related to the razor shells, a family which is considered to include Pharidae by some authorities.

Genera
Genera within the family Pharidae include:
 Afrophaxas Cosel, 1993
 Cultellus Schumacher, 1817
 Ensiculus H. Adams, 1860
 Ensis Schumacher, 1817
 Leguminaria Schumacher, 1817
 Nasopharus Cosel, 1993
 Neosiliqua Habe, 1965
 Novaculina Benson, 1830
 Orbicularia Deshayes, 1850
 Pharella Gray, 1854
 Pharus Leach in Brown, 1844
 Phaxas Leach in Gray, 1852
 Siliqua Megerle von Mühlfeld, 1811
 Sinonovacula Prashad, 1924
 Sinucultellus Cosel, 1993
 Sinupharus Cosel, 1993

References

 
Bivalve families